Lempäälä (Swedish also ) is a municipality in the Pirkanmaa region of Finland with  inhabitants. Lempäälä is located south of the city of Tampere.

The municipality center of Lempäälä is situated on an isthmus between the lakes Vanajavesi and Pyhäjärvi which are connected by the Kuokkalankoski rapids and the canal of Lempäälä that was built during the 1870s and is still in use.

The first written account of the parish of Lempäälä is from 1430. The oldest building of the town is a medieval church named after Saint Birgitta and was built in 1504. The only remaining article from medieval times in the church is a wooden crucifix carved out of birch.

Finnish novelist Yrjö Kokko lived in Lempäälä, and is buried in the graveyard.

Ideapark, the second largest shopping mall in Nordic countries, is located in Lempäälä along the Helsinki–Tampere motorway (E12).

Kuokkala

Kuokkala is a neighbourhood to the north of Lempäälä town which houses a ’museoraitti’ (museum trail). Several buildings now house collections of historical items, including a shop museum (also a shop and information office), hairdressers & barbers, cobblers,  WW2 memorabilia, household equipment, blacksmiths, carpenters, a 19th-century Finnish dwelling, and a special exhibit relating to the ex-Finnish region of Sakkola.

International relations

Twin towns — Sister cities
Lempäälä is twinned with:

  Ulricehamn, Sweden  
  Øvre Eiker, Norway 
  Kerteminde, Denmark  
  Tapolca, Hungary

Villages
 

Aimala

See also
 Nokia, Finland
 Pirkkala
 Puntala-rock, a punk rock festival

References

External links

Municipality of Lempäälä – Official site

 
Populated places established in 1866
1866 establishments in the Russian Empire